"Here Come the Good Times" is a song by Irish indie rock band A House, released as a single from their 1994 album Wide-Eyed and Ignorant. It is the only single by A House to reach the UK charts, reaching number 40.

"Here Come the Good Times" was re-recorded by members of the Irish soccer squad, and various Irish celebrities and boy band members for use as the official Irish 2002 World Cup anthem. Proceeds went to charity, and €40,000 was raised for Our Lady's Children's Hospital, Crumlin in Dublin. This version of the song topped the Irish Singles Chart.

"Here Comes the Good Times" was included on A House's 2002 greatest hits album, The Way We Were.

Track listings
"Here Come the Good Times" was released in two parts. Part 1 came in a 2-CD fold-out digipak, with space to contain Part 2.

CD1 Here Come the Good Times [Part 1]
 "Here Come the Good Times"
 "Children of the Revolution" (T.Rex)
 "I Feel Love" (Donna Summer)
 "Love Song" (The Damned)

CD2 Here Come the Good Times [Part 2]
 "Here Come the Good Times"
 "Everybody Needs Something"
 "Soon"
 "All We Need"

2002
 "Here Come the Good Times" (radio version)
 "Here Come the Good Times" (karaoke version)

Charts

A House version

Irish World Cup Squad version

Weekly charts

Year-end charts

References

External links
 Football's coming home (to A House), Hot Press

1994 singles
1994 songs
Irish Singles Chart number-one singles
MCA Records singles
Parlophone singles
Radioactive Records singles
Setanta Records singles
Warner Music Group singles